Nikolaus III, Prince Esterházy ((Regensburg, 25 June 1817 - Vienna, 28 January 1894) was the ninth prince of the Hungarian House of Esterházy.

Life 
Unlike his ancestors, Nikolaus did not spend his youth in the Schloss Esterháza in Hungary, but in England, where his father, Paul III Anton, Prince Esterházy, was Ambassador for the Austrian Emperor. Nikolaus married Lady Sarah Frederica Caroline Child Villiers (1822–1853), a daughter of George Child Villiers, 5th Earl of Jersey, and his wife the former Lady Sarah Sophia Fane. Lady Jersey was a close friend of his mother Princess Maria Theresia of Thurn and Taxis, who served with her for many years as a patroness of Almack's, the centre of London's social scene. They had three sons, Paul IV, Prince Esterházy (born 1843), Aloys (1844), and Anton (1851). His wife died in 1853.

After his return from England, Nikolaus entered into the service of the new Emperor Franz Joseph I of Austria, and accompanied him on his travels through Hungary and Transylvania. Like most of his ancestors, in 1862 he received the Order of the Golden Fleece.

In 1866, he succeeded his father, but under very difficult circumstances. In 1865 the Esterházy estates had been placed in the hands of curators until 1898, because of the enormous debts caused by his father's and grandfather's extravagance. Nikolaus was forced to sell the family's collection of paintings to the Kingdom of Hungary, and it still constitutes the core of the collection of the present-day Museum of Fine Arts in Budapest.

When he died in 1894 he was succeeded by his eldest son, Paul.

Ancestry

Sources 

|- 
! colspan="3" style="background: #ACE777; color: #000000" | Hungarian nobility

Esterházy family
Princes Esterházy of Galántha
1817 births
1894 deaths
Knights of the Golden Fleece of Austria
19th-century Hungarian people